Jungfer, Sie gefällt mir is an East German film, based upon the play The Broken Jug by Heinrich von Kleist. It was released in 1969.

Plot
A Saxon village in 1792: While the Prussians go against France, the haymaking takes place in the village and the resolute Marthe catches her daughter Ev with the village blacksmith Ruprecht in the hay.

See also
 List of East German films

External links
 

1969 films
East German films
1960s German-language films
Films based on works by Heinrich von Kleist
German courtroom films
Films set in 1792
Films set in Prussia
French Revolutionary Wars films
1960s German films